WYMB (920 AM) is a radio station broadcasting a sports format. It is licensed to Manning, South Carolina, United States.  The station is owned by Cumulus Media. It is simulcast with WWFN-FM in Lake City, South Carolina.

References

External links

YMB
CBS Sports Radio stations
Cumulus Media radio stations